Pat Buckley (born 10 February 1969) is an Irish Sinn Féin politician who has been a Teachta Dála (TD) for the Cork East constituency since the 2016 general election.

He was a member of Cork County Council from 2014 to 2016.

Personal life
He is a native of Midleton, County Cork. Buckley is married to Sandra and they have two children. 

Before entering politics Buckley made a living in construction work. His father had been a stonemason in the Midleton area.

Between 2002 and 2003, Buckley lost two brothers, Mark (30) and James (22) to suicide. This prompted him to become an active mental health, wellness and suicide prevention campaigner and he has spoken about his experience many times. Buckley and other concerned people in the Midelton community set up a charity, the Let's Get Together Foundation, to help raise awareness of the problem.

Political career
Buckley was elected to Cork County Council for the Cork East local electoral area in 2014, with 12.11% of the first preference vote, with his party running mate Michelle Hennessy narrowly missing out on the last seat with 9.33% of the vote.

In 2016, Buckley ran in the general election for the Cork East constituency, retaining the Sinn Féin seat won by Sandra McLellan in 2011 with 5,358 first preference votes.

In 2018, he was appointed Spokesperson on Mental Health and Suicide Prevention following Mary Lou McDonald's election to the role of President of Sinn Féin.

Since his election to the Dáil, he has been a member of the Oireachtas Committee on the Future of Healthcare helping to develop the Sláintecare report.

In 2017, Buckley was appointed to the Oireachtas Committee on the Future of Mental Healthcare which was tasked with developing a strategy for developing a world class public mental healthcare service.

At the general election in February 2020, Buckley was re-elected in the Cork East constituency.

Legal issues
Buckley received a three-year drink-driving ban and was fined €500 in December 2014 following an incident on 9 June 2013 when he was stopped while driving by Gardaí. Subsequent tests showed that Buckley was over three times above the permitted blood-alcohol level. Buckley stated after his conviction, "as a SF public representative I regret my actions and my choice to drive after drink."

Buckley pleaded guilty before Midleton District Court in May 2018 to being drunk and to engaging in threatening and abusive behaviour to a Garda in the course of his duty. His guilty plea was related to an incident which occurred at Buckley's home in August 2017 following a noise complaint. Responding officers were told to "fuck off" by Buckley who has stated that he was under the influence of alcohol and deeply regrets his behavior.

References

External links
Pat Buckley's page on the Sinn Féin website

1969 births
Alumni of Cork Institute of Technology
Living people
Local councillors in County Cork
Members of the 32nd Dáil
Sinn Féin TDs (post-1923)
Members of the 33rd Dáil